Rhysodes is a genus of ground beetle in the subfamily Rhysodinae native to the Palearctic (including Europe) and the Near East. 

There are currently two known species:
 Rhysodes comes (Lewis, 1888)
 Rhysodes sulcatus (Fabricius, 1787)

References

External links

Rhysodes at Fauna Europaea

Rhysodinae